"School Boy Crush" is a song from Average White Band's 1975 album, Cut the Cake.

It has been heavily sampled in hip hop, rap and R&B songs such as:.
"Ain't 2 Proud 2 Beg" by TLC
"Wanna B Where U R (Thisizzaluvsong)" by Floetry
"Watch Me Do My Thing" by Immature featuring Juanita "Smooth" Stokes and Kel Mitchell as Ed from Good Burger
"One Nite Stand" by Father MC
"Microphone Fiend" by Eric B. & Rakim
"New Agenda" by Janet Jackson
"Tear Shit Up" by Kurious
"Halftime" by Nas
"Life Is...Too Short" by Too Short
"What Goes On" by Artifacts
"Think About It (Special Ed)" by Special Ed
"Listen Me Tic (So So Def Remix)" by Ini Kamoze featuring Da Brat & Jermaine Dupri
"Shy Guy" by Diana King

References

1975 singles
1975 songs
Atlantic Records singles
Songs written by Hamish Stuart
Average White Band songs